"Nos rendez-vous" is a song recorded by Canadian singer Natasha St-Pier. Written by Patrice Guirao, Volodia and Gioacchino Maurici, and produced by Pascal Obispo, it was the second single from St-Pier's third album De l'amour le mieux (2002), and was released on 27 September 2002. It became the singer's sixth-most successful single in terms of peak positions on the French charts, hitting some success. In France, the single debuted at number 16 on the chart edition of 5 October 2002, reached a peak of number 15 in the third week, then dropped and remained for a total of 14 weeks in the top 50 and fell out of the top 100 after 17 weeks. On 17 December 2002, it earned a Gold disc for selling over 250,000 units. In Belgium (Wallonia), it entered the Ultratop 50 on 16 November 2002 at number 28, then jumped to a peak of number 15 and remained for 13 weeks in the top 40. In Switzerland, entered at a peak of number 45 on 24 November 2002, then dropped and fell off the top 100 after 11 weeks.

The song was included in St-Pier's best of Tu trouveras... 10 ans de succès (Best of), released in November 2009, on which it appears as the sixth track.

Track listings
 CD single - Promo
 "Nos rendez-vous" — 3:04

 CD single
 "Nos rendez-vous" — 3:04
 "De l'amour le mieux" — 4:10

Charts

Peak positions

Year-end charts

Certifications

References

2002 singles
Natasha St-Pier songs
Songs with lyrics by Patrice Guirao